The Bagatelle Gamefield (French Plaine de Jeux de Bagatelle) is a public recreation area for practicing various sports and leisure activities, among them football, rugby and cricket.

Located in the vicinity of the Bagatelle Park, in the region of the Bois de Boulogne in Paris, the field served as the stage for several aviation experiences of pioneer Alberto Santos Dumont in 1906.

The place preserves a monument which makes reference to the flight of 14-Bis, in which it is written:

Translated: Here, on November 12, 1906, under the control of the air club of France, Santos-Dumont established the world's first aviation records. Duration: 21s 1/5, Distance: 220m.

References

External links
 Aérostèles lieux de mémoire aéronautique 

Parks and open spaces in Paris
Alberto Santos-Dumont